Something Wonderful was the second album by the American vocalist Nancy Wilson, it was released in October 1960 by Capitol Records, and arranged by Billy May.

As with her debut album on the label, Like in Love, she was teamed up with Billy May, one of its star arrangers, who had come to prominence through his outstanding work with such singers as Nat King Cole, Dean Martin and Frank Sinatra.

The album spawned one of Wilson's all-time signature songs, "Guess Who I Saw Today". Another highlight was "What a Little Moonlight Can Do", which was, as critic Pete Welding wrote in his liner notes to the 1996 three-CD set Ballads, Blues & Big Bands: The Best of Nancy Wilson, "a song so closely associated with the sublime Billie Holiday (that) few would even have attempted it, let alone brought it off so well, with just the right blend of lightheartedness and sincerity."

In 2003, the UK label EMI Gold re-issued Something Wonderful on a 2-for-1 CD, coupled with its natural companion, Like in Love.

Track listing
 "Teach Me Tonight" (Gene de Paul, Sammy Cahn) – 2:51 
 "This Time the Dream's on Me" (Johnny Mercer, Harold Arlen) – 2:19
 "I'm Gonna Laugh You Out of My Life" (Cy Coleman, Joseph Allen McCarthy) – 2:40
 "I Wish You Love" (Léo Chauliac, Charles Trenet) – 2:00
 "Guess Who I Saw Today" (Murray Grand, Elisse Boyd) – 3:27
 "If Dreams Come True" (Edgar Sampson, Benny Goodman) – 1:49
 "What a Little Moonlight Can Do" (Harry M. Woods) – 2:27
 "The Great City" (Curtis Lewis) – 2:43
 "He's My Guy" (Gene de Paul, Don Raye) – 2:28
 "Something Happens to Me" (Marvin Fisher, Jack Segal) – 1:58
 "Call It Stormy Monday (But Tuesday Is Just as Bad)" (T-Bone Walker) – 2:28
 "Something Wonderful Happens" (Del Guerico, Gamse, Thorn) – 2:47

Personnel

Performance
Nancy Wilson – vocals
Billy May – arranger, conductor
Pete Candoli – trumpet
Frank Beach – trumpet
Conrad Gozzo – trumpet
Mannie Klein – trumpet
George Roberts – trombone
Si Zentner – trombone
Murray McEachern – trombone
Lloyd Ulyate – trombone
Ben Webster – tenor saxophone
Justin Gordon – flute
Emil Richards – vibraphone
Milt Raskin – piano & celeste
Jack Marshall – guitar
Joe Comfort – bass
Shelly Manne – drums

References

1960 albums
Nancy Wilson (jazz singer) albums
Albums arranged by Billy May
Albums produced by Dave Cavanaugh
Capitol Records albums
Albums recorded at Capitol Studios